Neutron tomography is a form of computed tomography involving the production of three-dimensional images by the detection of the absorbance of neutrons produced by a neutron source. It creates a three-dimensional image of an object by combining multiple planar images with a known separation. It has a resolution of down to 25 μm. Whilst its resolution is lower than that of X-ray tomography, it can be useful for specimens containing low contrast between the matrix and object of interest; for instance, fossils with a high carbon content, such as plants or vertebrate remains.

Neutron tomography can have the unfortunate side-effect of leaving imaged samples radioactive if they contain appreciable levels of certain elements such as cobalt, however in practice this neutron activation is low and short-lived such that the method is considered non-destructive.

The increasing availability of neutron imaging instruments at research reactors and spallation sources via peer-reviewed user access programs has seen neutron tomography achieve increasing impact across diverse applications including earth sciences, palaeontology, cultural heritage, materials research and engineering. In 2022, it was reported in the journal Gondwana Research that an ornithopod dinosaur was serendipitously discovered by neutron tomography in the gut content of Confractosuchus, a Cretaceous crocodyliform from the Winton Formation of central Queensland, Australia. This is the first time that a dinosaur has been discovered using neutron tomography, and to this day, the partially digested dinosaur remains entirely embedded within the surrounding matrix.

See also

References

Tomography
Neutron instrumentation